The Second Battle of İnönü was a battle fought between March 23 and April 1, 1921 near İnönü in present-day Eskişehir Province, Turkey during the Greco-Turkish War (1919–22), also known as the western front of the larger Turkish War of Independence. It marked a turning point in the Greco-Turkish War and the Turkish War of Independence of which it was a part, as Greek forces had previously been victorious over mostly irregular Turkish forces and suffered their first major halt in Asia minor campaign.

Background 

After the First Battle of İnönü, where Miralay (Colonel) İsmet Bey fought against a Greek detachment out of occupied Bursa, the Greeks prepared for another attack aiming the towns of Eskisehir and Afyonkarahisar with their inter-connecting rail-lines. Ptolemaios Sarigiannis, staff officer in the Army of Asia Minor, made the offensive plan.

Meanwhile, the London Conference was held between February 21 and March 11, 1921. The Turkish side was not able to extract the concessions it demanded and thus the hostilities resumed again in March.

Battle 

The Greeks were determined to make up for the setback they suffered in January and prepared a much larger force, outnumbering Mirliva İsmet's (a Pasha now) troops.

The Greeks had grouped their forces in Bursa, Uşak, İzmit and Gebze. Against them, the Turks had grouped their forces at northwest of Eskişehir, east of Dumlupınar and Kocaeli.

Participating in this battle were Turkish Western and Southern Fronts, Kocaeli Group and Kastamonu Command. Greek forces were from their Army of Asia Minor, I and III Army Corps.

Sarigiannis was in the Conference of London when the Greek attack began, with General Konstantinos Pallis, Chief of Staff of the Army of Asia Minor, to have made some changes in the initial offensive plan.

The battle began with a Greek assault on the positions of İsmet's troops on March 23, 1921. It took them four days to reach İnönü due to delaying action of the Turkish front. The better-equipped Greeks pushed back the Turks and took the dominant hill called Metristepe on the 27th. A night counter-attack by the Turks failed to recapture it. Meanwhile, on March 24, Greek I Army Corps took Kara Hisâr-ı Sâhib (present-day Afyonkarahisar) after running over Dumlupınar positions. On 31 March İsmet attacked again after receiving reinforcements, and recaptured Metristepe. In a continuation battle in April, Refet Pasha retook the town of Kara Hisâr. The Greek III Army Corps retreated.

Aftermath 
After the victory, İsmet Pasha despatched a telegram to Mustafa Kemal Pasha from Metristepe which notifies joy of victory is as follows. From Metristepe, 1st April 1921:

While the battle marked a turning point in the war, following the battles of İnönü there was a stalemate, as the Turks had missed their chance to encircle and destroy the Greek army, which retreated in good order. There were casualties on both sides, and neither side was in a position or state of mind to make more advances.

Most significantly, this was the first time the newly formed Turkish standing army faced their enemy and proved themselves to be a serious and well led force, not just a collection of rebels. This was a very much needed success for Mustafa Kemal Pasha, as his opponents in Ankara were questioning his delay and failure in countering the rapid Greek advances in Anatolia.  This battle forced the Allied capitals to take note of the Ankara Government and eventually within the same month they ended up sending their representatives there for talks. France and Italy changed their positions and became supportive of Ankara government in short order.

The Greeks were determined to defeat the Turkish nationalists and end their resistance though and prepared for even a bigger showdown at the battles of Kütahya–Eskişehir and Sakarya.

References 

Conflicts in 1921
Inonu 2
1921 in the Ottoman Empire
1921 in Greece
Hüdavendigâr vilayet
History of Eskişehir Province
March 1921 events
Battles of İsmet İnönü